St Andrew Island is an uninhabited island located in the Kimberley region of Western Australia.

The country is sparsely vegetated with shallow jointing, wide ledges and moderate scree.

Fauna found on the island include 8 species of bats, 47 birds including the white-bellied sea-eagle and the pied imperial pigeon, 20 types of reptiles, 5 frogs and 4 types of native mammal.

References 

Islands of the Kimberley (Western Australia)
Uninhabited islands of Australia